Gerd Schädlich (30 December 1952 – 29 January 2022) was a German football player and manager who is most known for managing East German professional teams Erzgebirge Aue and Chemnitzer FC. Schädlich died after a long illness on 29 January 2022, at the age of 69.

References

External links
 

1952 births
2022 deaths
People from Rodewisch
People from Bezirk Karl-Marx-Stadt
East German footballers
Footballers from Saxony
Association football midfielders
Chemnitzer FC players
East German football managers
German football managers
Chemnitzer FC managers
FC Erzgebirge Aue managers
3. Liga managers
FSV Zwickau managers